Royce Charles Lamberth /’læm-bərth/ (born July 16, 1943) is a senior judge of the United States District Court for the District of Columbia, who formerly served as its chief judge. Since 2015, he has sat as a visiting judge on the United States District Court for the Western District of Texas in San Antonio.

Education and career

Lamberth was born in 1943 in San Antonio, Texas. He graduated with a Bachelor of Arts degree from the University of Texas, where he was a member of the Tejas Club, and from the University of Texas School of Law, receiving a Bachelor of Laws in 1967. He served as a captain in the United States Army Judge Advocate General's Corps from 1968 to 1974, including one year in Vietnam. After that, he became an Assistant United States Attorney for the District of Columbia. In 1978, Lamberth became chief of the civil division of the United States Attorney's Office, a position he held until his appointment to the federal bench.

Federal judicial service
Lamberth was nominated by President Ronald Reagan on March 19, 1987, to the seat on the United States District Court for the District of Columbia vacated by Judge Barrington D. Parker. He was confirmed by the United States Senate on November 13, 1987, and commissioned on November 16, 1987. He served as chief judge from 2008 to 2013. He assumed senior status on July 15, 2013. He also served as presiding judge of the United States Foreign Intelligence Surveillance Court from 1995 to 2002. Since becoming a senior judge, Lamberth has been assigned as a visiting judge in San Antonio for several months per year at the United States District Court for the Western District of Texas.

Notable cases

Cobell v. Kempthorne
Lamberth presided over Cobell v. Kempthorne, a case in which a group of Native Americans sued the U.S. Department of the Interior for allegedly mismanaging a trust intended for their benefit. Lamberth, appointed to the bench by President Ronald Reagan, was known for speaking his mind and repeatedly ruled for the Native Americans in their class-action lawsuit. His opinions condemned the government and found Interior secretaries Gale Norton and Bruce Babbitt in contempt of court for their handling of the case. The appellate court reversed Lamberth several times, including the contempt charge against Norton. After a particularly harsh opinion in 2005, in which Lamberth lambasted the Interior Department as racist, the government petitioned the Court of Appeals to remove him, alleging that he was too biased to continue with the case. On July 11, 2006, the U.S. Court of Appeals for the District of Columbia Circuit, siding with the government, removed Judge Lamberth from the case.

1983 Beirut barracks bombing case
In May 2003, in a case brought by families of the two hundred forty-one servicemen who were killed in the 1983 Beirut barracks bombing, Lamberth ordered the Islamic Republic of Iran to pay US$2.65 billion for the actions of Hezbollah, a Shia militia group determined to be involved in the bombing in Beirut, Lebanon.

Guantanamo cases 

Lamberth has presided over Guantanamo captives habeas corpus petitions.

On December 29, 2016, Lamberth ordered the preservation of the full classified United States Senate Intelligence Committee report on CIA torture.
The six thousand–page report had taken Intelligence Committee staff years to prepare. A six hundred–page unclassified summary was published in December 2014, when Democratic Senator Dianne Feinstein chaired the committee, against objections of the Committee's Republican minority. Its publication stirred controversy. Limited copies of the classified report had been made, and human rights workers were concerned that the CIA would work to have all copies of the document destroyed.

James Rosen search warrants
In 2010, two federal magistrate judges approved a warrant sought by Attorney General Eric Holder's Justice Department to search personal e-mails and phone records of Fox News reporter James Rosen related to a story about the North Korean nuclear program.  In May 2010, Judge Lamberth overruled Magistrate Judge John Facciola's determination that the Justice Department needed to directly notify Rosen of the issuance of the warrant.  In May 2013, Lamberth issued an apology from the bench for the Clerk's Office's failure to unseal the search warrant docket entries, as Judge Lamberth himself had ordered the matter unsealed in November 2011.

Sherley v. Sebelius
In August 2010, Lamberth issued a temporary injunction blocking an executive order by President Barack Obama that expanded stem cell research. He indicated the policy violated a ban on federal money being used to destroy embryos, called the Dickey–Wicker Amendment. Susan Jacoby complained that his decision was more a reflection of his politics than a rigorous interpretation of the Dickey–Wicker Amendment.

Judge Lamberth refused to lift the injunction forbidding the research pending the appeal of his ruling, and the United States Court of Appeals for the District of Columbia Circuit issued an order on September 9, 2010, providing for an emergency temporary lifting of the injunction in the case that had forbidden the research, at the request of the Justice Department. A three judge panel from that court overturned Lamberth's decision in August 2012, and the Supreme Court denied the plaintiff's request for an appeal.

In re Kutler
In July 2011, Judge Lamberth ordered the release of Richard Nixon's testimony concerning the Watergate scandal. The Justice Department reviewed the decision after an objection from the administration insisting on the continued need for privacy of those involved.

Royer v. Federal Bureau of Prisons
On January 15, 2014, Judge Lamberth issued an order harshly criticizing the Department of Justice for what he described as its "sneering argument" that a federal prisoner had not been prejudiced by the Department's repeated failure to comply with discovery "because he remains incarcerated." Judge Lamberth went on to write that "[t]he whole point of this litigation is whether defendant can continue to single out plaintiff for special treatment as a terrorist during his continued period of incarceration. Did any supervising attorney ever read this nonsense that is being argued to this Court?" Judge Lamberth proceeded "to grant the inmate plaintiff pretty much all his discovery motion and hammer[ed] the DOJ by telling plaintiff to submit its request for sanctions in the form of award of attorney fees and costs." In response to the Order, the Justice Department moved to substitute new counsel "and remove the appearances of all prior counsel for Defendant in the above-captioned case," Assistant United States Attorneys Charlotte Abel, Laurie Weinstein, Rhonda Campbell and Rhonda Fields. This led one legal commentator to note that "[i]t appears that the government is seeking the clerk’s assistance in fundamentally altering the record, to intentionally conceal the identities of the assistants" who had been reprimanded by Judge Lamberth.

United States v. Bolton
In June 2020, Lamberth was assigned the case United States v. Bolton, in which the Trump administration sued to prevent the publication of John Bolton's book The Room Where It Happened. On June 20, Lamberth issued a ruling declining to enjoin the publication, but leaving the case open for other remedies.

See also
Commerce Department trade mission controversy

References

External links

|-

|-

1943 births
Living people
Military personnel from San Antonio
20th-century American judges
21st-century American judges
Assistant United States Attorneys
Judges of the United States District Court for the District of Columbia
Judges presiding over Guantanamo habeas petitions
United States Army officers
United States district court judges appointed by Ronald Reagan
University of Texas School of Law alumni
Texas lawyers
Lawyers from Washington, D.C.
Judges of the United States Foreign Intelligence Surveillance Court
United States Army Judge Advocate General's Corps